Chnootriba is a genus of beetles belonging to the family Coccinellidae.

The species of this genus are found in Europe and Africa.

Species:

Chnootriba elaterii
Chnootriba pavonia

References

Coccinellidae